The Singapore ATP Challenger is a tennis tournament held in Singapore since 2011.

Past finals

Singles

Doubles

References

External links

 
Singapore ATP Challenger
Singapore ATP Challenger
Singapore ATP Challenger